Hougaard is a Danish surname. Notable people with the surname include:

Børge Hougaard (1921–2012), Danish rower
Derick Hougaard (born 1983), South African rugby player
Francois Hougaard (born 1988), South African rugby player
Frank Hougaard (born 1963), Danish footballer
Jesper Hougaard, Danish poker player
Patrick Hougaard (born 1989), Danish motorcycle speedway rider

Danish-language surnames